Villeneuve is a French surname based on a toponym that means New City or New Town. Variations include: de Villeneuve or Devilleneuve, which means from New City / from New Town. It may refer to:

 Andrew Villeneuve, founder and executive director the Northwest Progressive Institute in the U.S.
 Anne Villeneuve (illustrator) (born 1966), Canadian writer and illustrator
 Anne Villeneuve (scientist), American geneticist
 Annie Villeneuve (born 1983), singer from Quebec, Canada
 Carel de Villeneuve (1897–1974), Dutch lawyer and public servant in Indonesia
 Denis Villeneuve (born 1967), film director
 Francine Villeneuve (born 1964), Canadian horse racing pioneer and thoroughbred jockey
 Gabrielle-Suzanne Barbot de Villeneuve (1695–1755), French writer
 Gilles Villeneuve (1950–1982), former Formula One driver
 Jacques Villeneuve (born 1971), racing driver, son of Gilles
 Jacques Villeneuve (racing driver, born 1953), racing driver and world champion snowmobile racer, brother of Gilles
 Jean-Marie-Rodrigue Villeneuve (1883-1947), Canadian Cardinal, Archbishop of Quebec
 Jérôme Pétion de Villeneuve (1756–1794), French writer and politician
 Julien Vallou de Villeneuve (1795–1866), French photographer
 Justin de Villeneuve, 1960s British celebrity, boyfriend and manager of the model Twiggy
 Louis Devilleneuve, French canoeist
 Noble Villeneuve (born 1938-2018), Canadian politician
 Pierre Devilleneuve, French canoeist
 Pierre-Charles Villeneuve (né Pierre-Charles-Silvestre de Villeneuve) (1763–1806), French admiral during the Napoleonic Wars
 Raymond Villeneuve (born 1943), political activist in Canada

See also
 Christian de Villeneuve-Esclapon (1852–1931), French politician
 Christophe de Villeneuve-Bargemon (1771–1829), French public official